Matthias Jacob Bovee (July 24, 1793 – September 12, 1872) was an American farmer and politician who served one term as a U.S. Representative from New York from 1835 to 1837.

Biography
Born in Amsterdam, New York, Bovee attended the rural school until the death of his father in 1807, then taught school in winter and worked the family farm in summer. He married Elizabeth Bovee, daughter of Isacc Bovee.

Career
Bovee was a school teacher who engaged in mercantile pursuits such as railroads and banks. In 1815 and served as chairman of the town of Amsterdam. He also served as member of the county board of supervisors. In the 1820's he was a member of the New York militia.  He was elected a member of the State assembly in 1826 and served as Trustee of the village of Amsterdam in 1831.

Congress 
Elected as a Jacksonian to the Twenty-fourth Congress, Bovee was United States Representative for the fifteenth district of New York from March 4, 1835, to March 3, 1837. Afterward, he returned to Amsterdam and resumed mercantile pursuits.

Later career 
In June 1843, Bovee moved to Milwaukee, Wisconsin, and two months later settled near Eagle, Waukesha County. he engaged in agricultural pursuits and was also Justice of the Peace for 10 years.

Death
Bovee died in Eagle, Wisconsin, on September 12, 1872 (age 79 years, 50 days). He is interred at Oak Ridge Cemetery, Eagle, Wisconsin. His sister Polly (Mary) was the wife of Congressman Benedict Arnold.

References

Further reading

External links

The Political Graveyard
Govtrackk US Congress

1793 births
1872 deaths
People from Amsterdam, New York
Jacksonian members of the United States House of Representatives from New York (state)
19th-century American politicians
People from Eagle, Wisconsin
Members of the United States House of Representatives from New York (state)